The Mayor Mohammed Hanif Flyover is the largest flyover in Bangladesh. Its foundation stone was laid in 2010 by Prime Minister Sheikh Hasina.

The flyover was initiated in 1998. It partially opened on 11 October 2013. It is built for easy transportation and communication purposes for the 30 southern and south-western districts of Bangladesh.

References

Transport in Bangladesh
Transport in Dhaka
Roads in Dhaka